Austerbogen (Eastern Bay) is a bay in Sørkapp Land at Spitsbergen, Svalbard. It is located between the headland of Kikutodden and Keilhaubreen at the eastern coast of Spitsbergen.

References

Bays of Spitsbergen